Stölzle Glass Group is an Austrian multinational manufacturer of glassware.

History
Karl Smola founded the Oberdorf glassworks in Bärnbach (Styria) on 15 June 1805.

In 1978, Stölzle Glasindustrie AG became Stölzle-Oberglas AC.

Structure
The company is headquartered in Köflach (Styria).

United Kingdom
Stölzle Flaconnage have a glassmaking site in the City of Wakefield district of West Yorkshire, where it has been since 1994 on the A645, and makes glass containers (around 100 million a year) and flint glass. The site had been founded as J.W. Bagley and Co in 1871. The site provides spirit (Scottish whisky) bottles for Diageo. Another site of Bagley became Rockware Glass.

References

External links
 Stölzle Flaconnage Ltd

1805 establishments in the Austrian Empire
Economy of West Yorkshire
Glassmaking companies of Austria
Manufacturing companies established in 1805
Austrian brands
Economy of Styria
Voitsberg District